Jocelyn François Gourvennec (born 22 March 1972) is a French professional football manager and former player who most recently was the head coach of Ligue 1 club Lille. He played as a midfielder for clubs such as Lorient, Rennes, Nantes, Marseille, Montpellier, Bastia, Angers, and Clermont.

Early life
Jocelyn François Gourvennec was born on 22 March 1972 in Brest, Finistère.

Club career
Gourvennec started his professional footballing career with Rennes and during his time at the club he won the Ligue 2 Player of the Year award of 1993. He later moved to Marseille, where he played in the 1999 UEFA Cup Final, winning a runners-up medal with the Olympians after losing 3–0 against Parma.

Managerial career
Following the end of his playing career, Gourvennec got into management, being named as Guingamp's manager in May 2010. On 3 May 2014, he led Guingamp to success in the Coupe de France for only their second time by beating his old club Rennes. In May 2016, Gourvennec took up the helm of Ligue 1 team Bordeaux.

On 8 November 2018, Gourvennec returned to Guingamp as their new manager after sacking Antoine Kombouaré. On 22 May 2019, the club announced that he had left the club by mutual agreement, after Gourvenenc was unable to guide the team to safety and the season ended with relegation to Ligue 2 for the first time since the 2003–04 season.

On 5 July 2021, he became the new manager of a Lille side fresh off winning the 2020–21 Ligue 1 title, following the departure of previous manager Christophe Galtier for Nice. On 1 August 2021, he won his first trophy with the club after defeating PSG 1–0 in the 2021 Trophée des Champions.

Managerial statistics

Honours

Managerial
Guingamp
 Coupe de France: 2013–14
 Coupe de la Ligue runner-up: 2018–19

Lille
Trophée des Champions: 2021

Individual
Ligue 2 Player of the Year: 1993–94
Ligue 2 Manager of the Year: 2012–13

References

External links

1972 births
Living people
Sportspeople from Brest, France
Footballers from Brittany
French footballers
France under-21 international footballers
France B international footballers
Association football midfielders
FC Lorient players
Stade Rennais F.C. players
FC Nantes players
Olympique de Marseille players
Montpellier HSC players
SC Bastia players
Angers SCO players
Clermont Foot players
Ligue 2 players
Ligue 1 players
Competitors at the 1993 Mediterranean Games
Mediterranean Games bronze medalists for France
Mediterranean Games medalists in football
French football managers
La Roche VF managers
En Avant Guingamp managers
FC Girondins de Bordeaux managers
Lille OSC managers
Ligue 1 managers
Ligue 2 managers
Rennes 2 University alumni